Dacia Aureliana was a province in the eastern half of the Roman Empire established by Roman Emperor Aurelian in the territory of former Moesia Superior after his evacuation of Dacia Traiana beyond the Danube in 271. Between 271/275 and 285, it occupied most of what is today northwestern Bulgaria and eastern Serbia. Its capital was in Serdica (modern Sofia).

This province was populated with the former inhabitants of Dacia Traiana. It is written in Eutropius' work: Abridgment of Roman History (9:15): 

"He surrounded the city of Rome with stronger walls. He built a temple to the Sun, in which he put a vast quantity of gold and precious stones. The province of Dacia, which Trajan had formed beyond the Danube, he gave up, despairing, after all Illyricum and Moesia had been depopulated, of being able to retain it. The Roman citizens, removed from the towns and lands of Dacia, he settled in the interior of Moesia, calling that Dacia which now divides the two Moesiae, and which is on the right hand of the Danube as it runs to the sea, whereas Dacia was previously on the left."

("Urbem Romam muris firmioribus cinxit. Templum Soli aedificavit, in quo infinitum auri gemmarumque constituit. Provinciam Daciam, quam Traianus ultra Danubium fecerat, intermisit, vastato omni Illyrico et Moesia, desperans eam posse retinere, abductosque Romanos ex urbibus et agris Daciae in media Moesia collocavit appellavitque eam Daciam, quae nunc duas Moesias dividit et est in dextra Danubio in mare fluenti, cum antea fuerit in laeva.")

The Emperor Diocletian's tetrarchy reorganization of the empire divided Dacia Aureliana in two provinces, both part of the civil diocese of Moesia(e), under the eastern Caesar (junior emperor), whose 'quarter' became the Praetorian prefecture of Illyricum. :
 Dacia Mediterranea, with its capital at Serdica 
 Dacia Ripensis, with its capital at Ratiaria 

In the fourth century reform (also splitting Italy in two while separating Egypt from Oriens and Macedonia from Moeasiae as new dioceses), these two “Dacias” along with Dardania, Moesia Prima, and Prevalitana constituted the Civil diocese of Dacia. Scholars have varying opinions regarding the exact date and circumstances of the creation of Dacia Mediterranea as a separate province.

References

Sources

External links 
 Forum Romanum

270s establishments in the Roman Empire
Roman Dacia
Late Roman provinces
Roman frontiers
Bulgaria in the Roman era
Serbia in the Roman era
Aurelian